Trichosteresis glabra is a species of Megaspilid wasp in the family Megaspilidae. It is found in Europe.

References

Parasitic wasps
Articles created by Qbugbot
Insects described in 1832
Ceraphronoidea